Japenoides is a genus of horse flies in the family Tabanidae.

Species
Japenoides aureus Mackerras, 1971
Japenoides cheesmanae Oldroyd, 1949
Japenoides festivus (Oldroyd, 1949)
Japenoides nigricostus Mackerras, 1971
Japenoides oudella (Oldroyd, 1949)
Japenoides ratcliffei (Mackerras & Rageau, 1958)
Japenoides veitchi (Bezzi, 1928)

References

Tabanidae
Diptera of Australasia
Diptera of Asia
Taxa named by Harold Oldroyd
Brachycera genera